Harris Beach State Park is an Oregon State Park located on US Highway 101, north of Brookings.  The day-use area offers a restroom and picnic area with tables, and the campground has RV sites, yurts and tent sites available year-round.

Harris Beach State Park is home to Bird Island (also known as Goat Island), which is reported to be the largest island off the Oregon Coast and is a National Wildlife Refuge.  The island is also a breeding site for rare birds such as the tufted puffin.

Lichen-forming fungi Helocarpon lesdainii can be found on Picea sitchensis (Sitka spruce) trees in the Park.

See also 
 List of Oregon State Parks

References 

State parks of Oregon
Oregon Coast
Parks in Curry County, Oregon
Beaches of Oregon
Landforms of Curry County, Oregon
Curry County, Oregon